Stoke and Wexham War Memorial is located in Wexham Street, Wexham, Buckinghamshire, England. It is a grade II listed building with Historic England and commemorates the men of the area who died in the First World War. It is in the form of a pavilion housing a pump that supplies a drinking fountain and horse trough. It was erected by Sir Bernard Oppenheimer (1866-1921).

References

External links

Grade II listed monuments and memorials
Grade II listed buildings in Buckinghamshire
British military memorials and cemeteries